I Am Love may refer to:

 "I Am Love" (The Jackson 5 song), 1975
 I Am Love (Jennifer Holliday song), 1983
 I Am Love (album), a 1981 album by Peabo Bryson, and the title track
 I Am Love (film), a 2009 Italian film